Carer's Allowance is a non-contributory benefit in the United Kingdom payable to people who care for a disabled person for at least 35 hours a week. It was first established as Invalid Care Allowance in 1976, and married women were not eligible. This policy was held to be unlawful sexual discrimination by the European Court in 1986 in the case of Jackie Drake.  See Carers rights movement   In May 2020 around 1.1 million people in England were entitled to Carer’s Allowance, of which 780,000 people were being paid it, according to the National Audit Office.

Main conditions

The claimant must be caring for a person who gets Disability Living Allowance (middle or higher rate for personal care), Attendance Allowance or Constant Attendance Allowance, Personal Independence Payment daily living component or Armed Forces Independence Payment and must care for them for at least 35 hours during the week.

Residence conditions

The claimant must have been present in Great Britain for 104 weeks out of the 156 weeks before claiming (two out of the last three years) and pass the habitual residence test.

Amount

£69.70 per week from April 2022 to 2023. It is taxable and counts as earned income.

Age limits

You must be over 16 years of age.

Excluded groups

People in full-time education or who are “gainfully employed”.  The benefit is not entitled if the claimant earns more than £132 per week from paid employment after tax, National Insurance Contributions and allowable expenses including half of any pension contributions, work-related expenses such as the cost of a lease car, and up to 100% of care costs. Income from e.g. occupational pensions and investment income is not considered as earned income, and is not included.

Scotland

As of September 2018, the Scottish Government's social security agency, Social Security Scotland, makes extra payments to Scottish residents who are in receipt of Carer's Allowance on specific "qualifying dates," known as the Carer's Allowance Supplement. This payment is paid twice a year and does not need to be applied for. The next payment of £226.20 will be made in December 2019, to claimants who are in receipt of Carer's Allowance on 14 October 2019.

Effect on other benefits

Counts in full as income for means-tested benefits but carries with it an entitlement to a Carer's Premium on all means-tested benefits, even if Carer's Allowance is not actually paid because of the overlapping rules. (You can’t normally get two income-replacement benefits, e.g. Carer's Allowance and the State Pension, paid together.)

If you can't be paid Carer's Allowance because of this rule, you have an ‘underlying entitlement’ to Carer's Allowance instead. This might mean you could get:

 the carer premiums in Jobseeker's Allowance and Income Support
 the extra amount for carers in Pension Credit
 the carer element in Universal Credit

This premium continues for eight weeks after you cease to be entitled to Carer's Allowance. It also entitles you to an earnings disregard of £15 if you haven’t already got one.

If there is a person claiming Carer's Allowance in respect of a disabled person then the disabled person cannot qualify for the Severe Disability Premium in any means-tested benefit. The claimant is entitled to a National Insurance credit to protect pension rights.

Proposals
In April 2019, the Labour Party announced that it would increase Carer's Allowance and raise the earnings threshold for it in line with the National Living Wage.

References

External links
 Carers Allowance
 Carers Allowance UK

Social security in the United Kingdom
1976 establishments in the United Kingdom